Jorge Caballero  (born on 14 April 1991 in Mexico City, Mexico) is a Mexican actor, best known in stage for his role of Claudio in the 2015 play adaptation titled El chico de la última fila, based on Juan Mayorga's book of the same name. He currently plays Matías in the Netflix's crime drama The Club.

Personal life 
Caballero currently has a relationship with Colombian singer Esteman since 2019.

Filmography

References

External links 
 

1992 births
Living people
Mexican male telenovela actors
Mexican male television actors
Mexican male film actors
21st-century Mexican male actors
Mexican gay actors